Allianz Stadium (Sydney) may refer to:

Sydney Football Stadium (1988)
Sydney Football Stadium (2022)